Parkland is a residential neighbourhood in the southeast quadrant of Calgary, Alberta, Canada. It is bounded to the north by Canyon Meadows Drive, to the east by Bow Bottom Trail and to the south and west by Fish Creek Provincial Park.

The land was annexed to the City of Calgary in 1961 and Parkland was established in 1974. It is represented in the Calgary City Council by the Ward 14 councillor.

Demographics

Residents in this community had a median household income of $103,357 in 2000, and there were 4.8% low income residents living in the neighbourhood. As of 2000, 14.6% of the residents were immigrants. A proportion of 0% of the buildings were condominiums or apartments, and 2.2% of the housing was used for renting.

Education
The community is served by Prince of Wales Elementary public school and St. Philip Elementary School (Catholic).

See also
List of neighbourhoods in Calgary

References

External links
Parkland Community Association

Neighbourhoods in Calgary